Ailly-sur-Noye is a railway station located in the course of Ailly-sur-Noye in the Somme department, France. The station is served by TER Hauts-de-France trains from Paris-Nord to Amiens.

The station dates from 1846 when the Paris-Amiens section of the Paris–Lille railway was opened.

Gallery

See also

List of SNCF stations in Hauts-de-France

References

Railway stations in Somme (department)
Railway stations in France opened in 1846